Azerbaijan competed at the 2012 Summer Olympics in London, United Kingdom, from 27 July to 12 August 2012. This was the nation's fifth consecutive appearance at the Olympics in the post-Soviet era. The National Olympic Committee of the Azerbaijani Republic sent the nation's largest delegation to the Games. A total of 53 athletes, 39 men and 14 women, competed in 15 sports. There was only a single competitor in road cycling, equestrian show jumping, fencing, and shooting. The Azerbaijani athletes also included their only defending champion, judoka Elnur Mammadli, who became the nation's flag bearer at the opening ceremony.

Azerbaijan left London with a total of 10 medals (2 gold, 2 silver, and 6 bronze), which doubled the nation's overall medal count at the 2004 Summer Olympics in Athens. This was also the nation's most successful Olympics, winning the largest number of medals received at a single games. More than half of these medals were awarded in wrestling, including gold medals won by Toghrul Asgarov and Sharif Sharifov from the men's freestyle events.

Medalists

| width=78% align=left valign=top |

| width=22% align=left valign=top |

Competitors

| width=78% align=left valign=top |

| width=22% align=left valign=top |

Athletics 

Key
 Note – Ranks given for track events are within the athlete's heat only
 Q = Qualified for the next round
 q = Qualified for the next round as a fastest loser or, in field events, by position without achieving the qualifying target
 NR = National record
 N/A = Round not applicable for the event
 Bye = Athlete not required to compete in round

Men
Track & road events

Field events

Women
Track & road events

Boxing

Men

 Initially the judges awarded the victory to Abdulhamidov who beat Shimizu 22:17. The Japanese team appealed the decision claiming the referee had overlooked three of Abdulhamidov's six falls during the fixture. Upon further review, the judges decided to annul the initial result and declared Shimizu the winner.

Women

Canoeing

Sprint

Qualification Legend: FA = Qualify to final (medal); FB = Qualify to final B (non-medal);

Cycling

Road

Equestrian

Show jumping

Fencing

Women

Gymnastics

Artistic
Men

Rhythmic
Women

Judo

Men

Women

Rowing

Men

Women

Qualification Legend: FA=Final A (medal); FB=Final B (non-medal); FC=Final C (non-medal); FD=Final D (non-medal); FE=Final E (non-medal); FF=Final F (non-medal); SA/B=Semifinals A/B; SC/D=Semifinals C/D; SE/F=Semifinals E/F; Q=Quarterfinals; R=Repechage

Shooting

Women

Swimming 

Azerbaijan sent two swimmers to the London games, by Universality places. Butterfly swimmer Yevgeniy Lazuka previously competed under Belarus in Beijing.

Men

Women

Taekwondo

Weightlifting

Men

1 On 29 March 2019, the IOC stripped Valentin Hristov of his bronze medal.

2 Sardar Hasanov replaced Ivan Stoitsov on the team on 21 July 2012, due to Stoitsov's injury.

† Velichko Cholakov did not compete in the event due to an injury.

Women

Wrestling 

Key
  - Victory by Fall.
  - Decision by Points - the loser with technical points.
  - Decision by Points - the loser without technical points.

Men's freestyle

Men's Greco-Roman

Women's freestyle

References

2012 in Azerbaijani sport
Nations at the 2012 Summer Olympics
2012